Sikandar Siddique (born 4 October 1986 in Copenhagen) is a Danish politician who was a member of the Folketing from 2019 to 2022. He was elected in the 2019 Danish general election as a member of The Alternative. He is the co-founder and leader of Independent Greens.

Political career
Siddique was elected into parliament in the 2019 election as a member of The Alternative. In March 2020 Siddique and three other members of The Alternative left the party. Siddique founded the new Independent Greens party with Susanne Zimmer and Uffe Elbæk. Siddique was not re-elected in the 2022 Danish general election.

References

External links 
 Biography on the website of the Danish Parliament (Folketinget)

1986 births
Living people
Politicians from Copenhagen
The Alternative (Denmark) politicians
Independent Greens (Denmark) politicians
Members of the Folketing 2019–2022
Leaders of political parties in Denmark
Danish people of Pakistani descent